Hassendean railway station served the village of Hassendean, Scottish Borders, Scotland from 1850 to 1969 on the Waverley Route.

History 
The station opened in March 1850 by the North British Railway. The station was situated on the south side of the B6405. The goods yard was on the up side of the line, entered from the south. It consisted of two sidings, one serving a small loading dock and a brick goods shed the other serving a cattle dock. Goods services ceased on 28 December 1964. The station was downgraded to an unstaffed halt on 27 March 1967, although the suffix 'halt' was never shown in the timetables. The station was closed to passengers on 6 January 1969.

References

External links 

Disused railway stations in the Scottish Borders
Railway stations in Great Britain opened in 1850
Railway stations in Great Britain closed in 1969
Beeching closures in Scotland
Former North British Railway stations
1850 establishments in Scotland
1969 disestablishments in Scotland